In Greek mythology Himalia (Ancient Greek: Ἱμαλίας) was a nymph of the eastern end of the island of Rhodes.

Mythology 
According to Diodorus Siculus Zeus was enamoured with her and she produced three sons with him, Spartaeus, Kronios, and Kytos: no further information about them survives. Jennifer Larson observes that the dictionary compiler  Hesychius of Alexandria gives ίμαλιά. denoting an abundance of wheat meal, and notes the agricultural connotations of the sons' names: "Spartaios recalls sowing, and Kytos means a basket or jar. Kronios denotes a descendant of Kronos, the god of the Golden Age", a mythic time of ease and abundance.

Notes

References 

 Diodorus Siculus, The Library of History translated by Charles Henry Oldfather. Twelve volumes. Loeb Classical Library. Cambridge, Massachusetts: Harvard University Press; London: William Heinemann, Ltd. 1989. Vol. 3. Books 4.59–8. Online version at Bill Thayer's Web Site
 Diodorus Siculus, Bibliotheca Historica. Vol 1-2. Immanel Bekker. Ludwig Dindorf. Friedrich Vogel. in aedibus B. G. Teubneri. Leipzig. 1888-1890. Greek text available at the Perseus Digital Library.

Nymphs
Divine women of Zeus
Rhodian characters in Greek mythology